Tarnów railway station is a railway station in Tarnów (Lesser Poland), Poland. As of 2022, it is served by Koleje Małopolskie (KMŁ), Polregio, and PKP Intercity (EIP, InterCity, and TLK services).

Train services

The following services serve the station:

EuroCity services (EC) (EC 95 by DB) (IC by PKP) Berlin - Frankfurt (Oder) - Rzepin - Wrocław – Katowice – Kraków – Rzeszów – Przemyśl
Express Intercity Premium services (EIP) Gdynia - Warsaw - Kraków - Rzeszów
Intercity services (IC) Zielona Góra - Wrocław - Opele - Częstochowa - Kraków - Rzeszów - Przemyśl
Intercity services (IC) Ustka - Koszalin - Poznań - Wrocław - Katowice - Kraków - Rzeszów - Przemyśl
Regional services (PR) Katowice — Kraków — Dębica 
Regional services (PR) Tarnów - Dębica - Rzeszów
Regional services (PR) Kraków - Bochnia - Tarnów - Dębica - Rzeszów
Regional services (PR) Kraków - Bochnia - Tarnów - Nowy Sącz - Piwniczna
Regional services (PR) Kraków - Bochnia - Tarnów - Nowy Sącz - Piwniczna - Krynica-Zdrój
Regional services (PR) Tarnów - Dębica - Rzeszów - Jarosław - Przemyśl
Regional Service (PR) Tarnów - Nowy Sącz - Muszyna
Regional Service (KMŁ)  Oświęcim (Auschwitz) - Trzebinia - Kraków Gł. - Tarnów

References 

Station article at koleo.pl

Railway stations in Lesser Poland Voivodeship
Railway stations served by Przewozy Regionalne InterRegio
Railway station
Railway stations in Poland opened in 1856